American Fork Presbyterian Church (also known as Community Presbyterian Church) is a historic church in American Fork, Utah, United States that is listed on the National Register of Historic Places (NRHP).

Description
The Gothic Revival church building is located at 75 North 100 East and was constructed in 1879. The building was added to the National Register of Historic Places in 1980. It is significant as the first Protestant church in American Fork.

Two meetinghouses of the Church of Jesus Christ of Latter-day Saints (the Church) in American Fork are also NRHP-listed.  Non-members of the LDS Church became more numerous after the transcontinental railroad opened in 1869.

The 1984 movie Footloose filmed most of the movie's church scenes in the church.

As of 2012 the congregation is affiliated with the Presbyterian Church (U.S.A.).

See also

 National Register of Historic Places listings in Utah County, Utah
 American Fork Second Ward Meetinghouse
 American Fork Third Ward Meetinghouse

References

External links

 

Presbyterian churches in Utah
Churches on the National Register of Historic Places in Utah
Gothic Revival church buildings in Utah
Churches completed in 1879
Religious buildings and structures in Utah County, Utah
Buildings and structures in American Fork, Utah
National Register of Historic Places in Utah County, Utah